Daniele Conti (born 9 January 1979) is an Italian football manager and former player, who played most of his career for Cagliari as a midfielder; he currently works as a co-ordinator for the club's youth side. He is the son of former A.S. Roma and Italy star Bruno Conti, and the younger brother of fellow footballer Andrea Conti.

Club career
Conti started his career at his father's club Roma, debuting in 1996. In 1999, he was sold to Cagliari in a co-ownership deal for 800 million lire (€413,166). He did not leave the club despite the club being relegated in 2000. In June 2000 Cagliari signed him outright for another 1.25 billion lire (€645,571).

In June 2004, he was in the team when they were the runner-up of Serie B and returned to Serie A after 4 seasons. Conti became the new team captain after the retirement of long-serving Uruguayan defender Diego López in 2010.

In January 2013 Conti extended his contract for 1 more year. On 10 November 2013, he scored a brace against Torino. His father Bruno wrote an open letter which was published on the local newspaper L'Unione Sarda several days later, congratulating him on a stellar career – earlier that year Daniele became the club's all-time appearance maker, breaking local legend Mario Brugnera's three decade-old record. He retired at the end of the 2014–15 season, after sixteen years with the club. In total, he made 464 appearances for Cagliari, scoring 51 goals.

International career
Conti played once for the Italy U21 team, on 16 August 2000, in a 2–0 friendly win over the Mexico U23 side.

Managerial career
In July 2016, Cagliari signed Conti as a co-ordinator for the club's youth system.

Personal life
Conti is married to long-time girlfriend Valeria and they have two sons, Bruno (named after his grandfather) and Manuel.

References

External links
Profile and Statistics on the Lega Serie A website
 Gazzetta dello Sport player profile
FIGC
Aic.football.it profile

1979 births
Living people
People from Nettuno
Italian footballers
Italy under-21 international footballers
A.S. Roma players
Cagliari Calcio players
Serie A players
Serie B players
Association football midfielders
Footballers from Lazio
Sportspeople from the Metropolitan City of Rome Capital